The 2012–13 Manhattan Jaspers basketball team represented Manhattan College during the 2012–13 NCAA Division I men's basketball season. The Jaspers, led by second year head coach Steve Masiello, played their home games at Draddy Gymnasium and were members of the Metro Atlantic Athletic Conference. They finished the season 14–18, 9–9 in MAAC play to finish in a tie for sixth place. They advanced to the championship game of the MAAC tournament before falling to Iona.

Roster

Schedule

|-
!colspan=9 style=";"|Regular Season

|-
!colspan=9 style=";"| MAAC tournament

References

Manhattan Jaspers basketball seasons
Manhattan
Manhattan Jaspers basketball
Manhattan Jaspers basketball